The Junior Belfast Giants are ice hockey team that plays in the Irish Ice Hockey League.  They play their games in the 1,500 seat Dundonald Ice Bowl in Dundonald, Northern Ireland.  The club joined the IIHL for the 2008-2009 season and they also field a U20 team in the IIHL's Developmental Division.

History

The Junior Belfast Giants were officially formed in June 2007 when the Belfast City Flyers and the Northern Ireland Ice Hockey club combined forces because they felt the best way to further the sport in the area was to form one strong club.  Todd Kelman, General Manager of the Belfast Giants helped the club find a main sponsor and allowed the club to use the Belfast Giants name but other than that the 2 teams are not related.

Tesco provided the club with jerseys and socks for every player in the organization, funding for the club, as well as made 10 jobs available to club players working in its stores in Northern Ireland.

Roster

Roster as of February 2, 2009

Notes

External links
 

Ice hockey teams in Ireland
Belfast Giants